Muhammad Zain Elahi (born 15 April 1987) is a Pakistani politician who had been a member of the National Assembly of Pakistan from June 2013 to May 2018.

Early life and education
He was born on 15 April 1987 to Tahir Sadiq Khan.

Elahi received his education in global management from United Kingdom.

Elahi is the nephew of Chaudhry Shujaat Hussain.

Political career

Elahi was elected to the National Assembly of Pakistan from Constituency NA-59 (Attock-III) as an independent candidate in 2013 Pakistani general election. He received 60,850 votes and defeated a candidate of Pakistan Muslim League (N) (PML-N).

Elahi became youngest parliamentarian to be elected in 2013 general election at the age of 26.

References

Living people
Punjabi people
Pakistani MNAs 2013–2018
1987 births
Chaudhry family